Canvas Back Duck is a 1953 Walt Disney animated short film starring Donald Duck and his nephews.

Plot
Donald and his nephews visit a carnival. While they play games, Donald is tricked by a shifty barker into fighting "Pee Wee Pete" (Pegleg Pete), a truculent bruiser who significantly outweighs Donald. In spite of help from Huey, Dewey and Louie, the situation looks desperate for Donald Duck, until his fist accidentally connects with Pete's jaw, which crumbles. It turns out Pegleg Pete literally had a glass jaw. Donald wins the prize money and exits the carnival triumphantly with his nephews.

Voice cast
 Donald Duck: Clarence Nash
 Pegleg Pete: Billy Bletcher
 Huey, Dewey and Louie: Clarence Nash

Home media
The short was released on November 11, 2008, on Walt Disney Treasures: The Chronological Donald, Volume Four: 1951-1961.

References

External links
 
 

1953 films
1953 animated films
1950s sports films
1950s Disney animated short films
Donald Duck short films
Boxing animation
American boxing films
Films directed by Jack Hannah
Films produced by Walt Disney
Films scored by Oliver Wallace
1950s English-language films